WHY@DOLL, also known as , is a Japanese dance-pop girl duo formed in 2011. WHY@DOLL moved to Tokyo in November 2013 and signed a contract with VERSIONMUSIC  in 2014. The duo made its major debut with the single Magic Motion No.5 released in September 2014. After releasing three singles, one mini album and one album from VERSIONMUSIC, WHY@DOLL signed a new contract with T-Palette Records in 2016.

Members

Discography

Singles

Mini Album

Albums

References 

2011 establishments in Japan
Japanese girl groups